Vernon Wallace Thomson (November 5, 1905 – April 2, 1988) was an American attorney and politician who served as the 34th Governor of Wisconsin from 1957 to 1959.

Early life and education
Vernon Thomson was born in Richland Center, Wisconsin. He attended what is now Carroll University, in 1925, but graduated from what is now the University of Wisconsin–Madison, in 1927,  where he was a member of the Chi Phi Fraternity. In 1932, he received his law degree and practiced law.

Career

Thomson became involved in the Republican Party. He was mayor of Richland Center from 1944 to 1951 and a member of the Wisconsin State Assembly from 1935 to 1951, and served as Speaker of the Assembly from 1939 to 1945. He served as Attorney General of Wisconsin from 1951 to 1957. In 1956, he was elected governor of Wisconsin, defeating William Proxmire; he was defeated for reelection as governor in 1958 by Gaylord Nelson.

In 1960, he was elected to the United States House of Representatives representing Wisconsin's 3rd congressional district. He served in the 87th and was reelected to the six succeeding congresses. He was defeated for reelection in 1974, losing to Alvin Baldus. He resigned before the official end of his term, overall serving from January 3, 1961 till December 31, 1974. Thomson was a member of the Federal Elections Commission.

Thomson died in Washington, D.C., and was buried in Richland Center, Wisconsin.

Notes

External links

1905 births
1988 deaths
Governors of Wisconsin
Members of the Wisconsin State Assembly
Speakers of the Wisconsin State Assembly
Wisconsin Attorneys General
Mayors of places in Wisconsin
People from Richland Center, Wisconsin
University of Wisconsin–Madison alumni
University of Wisconsin Law School alumni
Members of the Federal Election Commission
Washington, D.C., Republicans
Republican Party members of the United States House of Representatives from Wisconsin
Republican Party governors of Wisconsin
20th-century American politicians
Burials in Wisconsin
Ford administration personnel
Carter administration personnel
Reagan administration personnel